Sağlarca is a village in the Siirt District of Siirt Province in Turkey. The village is populated by Kurds of the Botikan tribe and had a population of 30 in 2022.

History 
The village was abandoned in the 1990s due to  harassment by the Turkish military. It had a population of around 500 before the depopulation.

Population 
Population history from 1965 to 2022:

References 

Villages in Siirt District
Kurdish settlements in Siirt Province